Argeus ("the hunter") can refer to:

Greek mythology
 Argeus (king of Argos) 
 Argeus, a surname of Pan and Aristaeus
 Argeus, one of the sons (in a rare version of the myth) of Phineus and Danaë, the other being Argus
 Argeus, son of Deiphontes and Hyrnetho
 Argeus, one of the Niobids
 Argeus, son of Licymnius, brother of Melas 
 Argeus, son of Pelops and Hippodamia, by Hegesandra father of Alector and Boethoos

People
 Argeus, Roman Catholic saint, one of Narcissus, Argeus, and Marcellinus
Argeus (pretender), a pretender to the throne of Macedonia, Ancient Greece

Places
 Mount Erciyes, Kayseri, Turkey, known to the Romans as Argeus

See also
 Agreus, one of the Panes
 Argaeus (disambiguation)